"If It Wasn't for Love" is a song recorded and written by Canadian singer Deborah Cox. Released as a standalone single on November 26, 2011, the track became her 11th number one hit on Billboard's US Dance Club Songs.

Track listings

Charts

Weekly charts

Year-end charts

References

2011 songs
2011 singles
Deborah Cox songs
Songs written by Deborah Cox
Songs written by Janice Robinson